Mutation frequency and mutation rates are highly correlated to each other. Mutation frequencies test are cost effective in laboratories  however; these two concepts provide vital information in reference to accounting for the emergence of mutations on any given germ line.

There are several test utilized in measuring the chances of mutation frequency and rates occurring in a particular gene pool.  Some of the test are as follows:
 Avida Digital Evolution Platform 
 Fluctuation Analysis 

Mutation frequency and rates provide vital information about how often a mutation may be expressed in a particular genetic group or sex. Yoon et., 2009 suggested that as sperm donors ages increased the sperm mutation frequencies increased.  This reveals the positive correlation in how males are most likely to contribute to genetic disorders that reside within X-linked recessive chromosome.
There are additional factors affecting mutation frequency and rates involving evolutionary influences.  Since, organisms may pass mutations to their offspring incorporating and analyzing the mutation frequency and rates of a particular species may provide a means to adequately comprehend its longevity

Aging

The time course of spontaneous mutation frequency from middle to late adulthood was measured in four different tissues of the mouse.  Mutation frequencies in the cerebellum (90% neurons) and male germ cells were lower than in liver and adipose tissue.  Furthermore, the mutation frequencies increased with age in liver and adipose tissue, whereas in the cerebellum and male germ cells the mutation frequency remained constant

Dietary restricted rodents live longer and are generally healthier than their ad libitum fed counterparts.  No changes were observed in the spontaneous chromosomal mutation frequency of dietary restricted mice (aged 6 and 12 months) compared to ad libitum fed control mice.  Thus dietary restriction appears to have no appreciable effect on spontaneous mutation in chromosomal DNA, and the increased longevity of dietary restricted mice apparently is not attributable to reduced chromosomal mutation frequency.

References

See also 
 Allele frequency
 Mutation
 Mutation rate

Cell biology